Jinyang County is a county of Sichuan Province, China. It is under the administration of the Liangshan Yi Autonomous Prefecture.

Climate

References

Liangshan Yi Autonomous Prefecture
County-level divisions of Sichuan